Neamine transaminase (glutamate---6'-dehydroparomamine aminotransferase, btrB (gene), neoN (gene), kacL (gene)) is an enzyme with systematic name neamine:2-oxoglutarate aminotransferase. This enzyme catalyses the following chemical reaction

 neamine + 2-oxoglutarate  6'-dehydroparomamine + L-glutamate

The reaction occurs in vivo in the opposite direction.

References

External links 
 

EC 2.6.1